Nanak Wara, originally laid out as the Jail Quarter, is a neighbourhood in central Karachi, Pakistan. The neighbourhood is part of the wider Saddar Town borough, and is located north of MA Jinnah Road. It is situated between Jodia Bazaar and Mithadar on the east, and Gazdarabad on the west. To the south is the Serai Quarter and Aram Bagh.

Gallery 
The following are heritage buildings in Nanak Wara which are protected by the Government of Sindh:

References

External links 
 Karachi Website

Neighbourhoods of Karachi
Saddar Town